The River Crane is a river in Dorset, United Kingdom. It flows past Cranborne Manor. Near Verwood it becomes the Moors River.

The name is a shortening of Cranbourne, meaning a stream frequented by cranes (or herons).

References

Crane